This family contains acyltransferases involved in phospholipid biosynthesis and proteins of unknown function. This family also includes tafazzin, the Barth syndrome gene.

Subfamilies 
1-acyl-sn-glycerol-3-phosphate acyltransferase

Human proteins containing this domain 
AGPAT1;    AGPAT2;    AGPAT3;    AGPAT4;    AGPAT5;    AGPAT6;    AGPAT7;    AYTL1;     
AYTL2;     GNPAT;     GPAM;      GPAT3;   LYCAT;     TAZ;       TMEM68;

References

Protein domains
Protein families